Julian Deryl Hart (August 27, 1894 – June 1, 1980) served as President of Duke University from 1960 to 1963. Previously, he was the Professor and Chairman of the Department of Surgery at Duke.  During his presidency of three years, he planned and initiated programs to enhance the "academic excellence" of the university.  For example, he redefined the Office of the Registrar, Undergraduate Admissions, and Development.  Faculty salaries increased and the number of distinguished professorships doubled.  He also was instrumental in amending the admissions policy to uphold equality regardless of race, creed, or national origin.

Hart's home, the J. Deryl Hart House in Durham, North Carolina, serves as the official residence of Duke's presidents.

Notes

External links
Inventory of the J. Deryl Hart Records, University Archives, Duke University
J. Deryl Hart Papers at Duke University Medical Center Archives

1894 births
1980 deaths
Duke University faculty
Presidents of Duke University
Burials in North Carolina
People from Buena Vista, Georgia
Burials at Duke University Chapel
20th-century American academics